The Hanabej dam is a dam in Saudi Arabia opened in 1979 and located in Riyadh region.

See also 
 List of dams in Saudi Arabia

References 

Dams in Saudi Arabia